Augustus Kargbo (born 24 August 1999) is a Sierra Leonean professional footballer who plays for Italian side Crotone.

Early career
As a boy Augustus Kargbo was scouted by his agent Numukeh Tunkara in Freetown, Sierra Leone at age of 13 years. Believing in his quality he then persuaded the family to allow him to take the boy to Guinea where he could have a better training and development opportunity.

Club career
He started his professional career in Italian fourth-tier Serie D club Campobasso.

In the summer of 2018, he joined Serie B club Crotone and was loaned back to Serie D, to Rocella. He returned from loan in January 2019.

He made his Serie B debut for Crotone on 19 January 2019 in a game against Cittadella, as a 68th-minute substitute for Marco Firenze.

On 2 September 2019, he joined Reggiana on loan. On 22 July he scored an important goal for the promotion of the club in Serie B in the final against Bari.

He made his Serie A debut for Crotone on 20 September 2020 in a 1–4 away loss against Genoa. On 29 September 2020 he returned to Reggiana on a new loan.

International career 
On 29 September 2020, he was called up by Sierra Leone for the first team.

He made his debut for the Sierra Leone national football team on 6 October 2021 in a friendly against South Sudan.
In December 2021, he was named in the Sierra Leone squad for the upcoming 2021 Africa Cup of Nations as the nation prepared for their first appearance at the competition since 1996.

References

External links
 

1999 births
Sportspeople from Freetown
Living people
Sierra Leonean footballers
Sierra Leone international footballers
Association football forwards
A.S.D. Roccella players
F.C. Crotone players
A.C. Reggiana 1919 players
Serie A players
Serie B players
Serie D players
Sierra Leonean expatriate footballers
Sierra Leonean expatriate sportspeople in Italy
Expatriate footballers in Italy
2021 Africa Cup of Nations players